Stanislas Bober (Nanterre, 12 March 1930 — Paris, 8 July 1975) was a French professional road bicycle racer. Bober won a stage in the 1953 Tour de France.

Major results

1952
Paris–Bourges
1953
Circuit de l'Indre
Tour de France:
Winner stage 3
1955
Lézignan

External links 

Official Tour de France results for Stanislas Bober

1930 births
1975 deaths
People from Nanterre
French male cyclists
French Tour de France stage winners
Sportspeople from Hauts-de-Seine
Cyclists from Île-de-France